Mycteroperca  bonaci, the black grouper, black rockfish or marbled rockfish, is a species of marine ray-finned fish, a grouper from the subfamily Epinephelinae which is part of the family Serranidae, which also includes the anthias and sea basses. Other fish are sometimes called the black grouper including the similar gag grouper (Mycteroperca microlepis), the misty grouper (Hyporthodus mystacinus), and the critically endangered Warsaw grouper (Epinephelus nigritus). This species is found in the western Atlantic Ocean from the northeastern United States to Brazil.

Description
Myctoperca bonaci has an oblong, laterally compressed body with a standard length which is 3.3 to 3.5 times its depth. It has an evenly rounded preopercle with no incisions or lobes at its angle. The dorsal fin contains 11 spines and 15-17 soft rays while the anal fin has 3 spines and 11-13 soft rays, both fins having rounded margins. The caudal fin is truncate to emarginate, althoughit  may be convex if spread widely. This species has an overall t’s an olive grey colour  and is marked with dark blotches and brassy hexagonal spots over the head and flanks. The pectoral fins are sooty brown, fading to orange towards the margin; the soft rayed part of the dorsal fin and the anal fin, as well as the forward edge of the pelvic fin have a dark margin.

Distribution
Mycteroperca bonaci is found in the western Atlantic where its range extends from Cape Canaveral in Florida and Bermuda south to the Bahamas, into the Gulf of Mexico as far north as Alabama and from southern Texas along the coast of Mexico and Cuba. It occurs throughout the Caribbean Sea, along the coast of South America to Santa Catarina in Brazil. Its range extends to the Brazilian islands of Trinidade and Fernando de Noronha. There is a gap in its distribution along the northern coast of South America between Paramaribo in Suriname and Maranhao in Brazil. Occurrences in United States waters north to Massachusetts are juveniles and therefore considered vagrants.

Habitat and biology
It is usually a solitary species, the adults feeding mainly on fishes, such as grunts, snapper and herrings, and the juveniles feed on crustaceans. Black groupers have been recorded forming seasonal feeding aggregations along the outer continental shelf off Brazil, these coincide with spawning aggregations of some fish species the groupers prey on. They are monandric protogynous hermaphrodites and form spawning aggregations which have been reported from in the Gulf of Mexico and Caribbean Sea.

Predators and parasites
The recorded predators of Mycteroperca bonaci include sandbar shark (Carcharhinus plumbeus) and great hammerhead (Sphyrna mokarran) while they may also be prey for great barracuda (Sphyraena barracuda) and moray eels. Black groupers are hosts to a variety of common parasites which include endoparasites affecting stomach and intestines and ectoparasites which live on its skin.

Taxonomy
Mycteroperca bonaci was first formally described as Serranus bonaci in 1860 by the Cuban zoologist Felipe Poey (1799-1891) with Cuba being given as the type locality.

Utilisation
Mycteroperca bonaci is quite tasty and an important food fish. It is fished for sale and for sport.

Conservation
Mycteroperca bonaci is an IUCN Red List near threatened species, vulnerable to increases in exploitation because it is a relatively slow breeder.

References

External links
 

black grouper
Fauna of Bermuda
Fauna of the Southeastern United States
Fish of the Western Atlantic
Taxa named by Felipe Poey 
black grouper